The 1987 Women's EuroHockey Nations Championship was the second edition of the Women's EuroHockey Nations Championship, the quadrennial international women's field hockey championship of Europe organized by the European Hockey Federation. It was held at the Picketts Lock in London, England from 3 to 13 September 1987.

The defending champions the Netherlands won their second title by defeating the hosts England 3–1 in penalty strokes after the match finished 2–2 after extra time. The Soviet Union won the bronze medal by defeating West Germany 2–1.

Preliminary round

Pool A

Pool B

Classification round

Ninth to twelfth place classification

Fifth to eighth place classification

First to fourth place classification

Final standings

See also
1987 Men's EuroHockey Nations Championship

References

External links
Eurohockey Nations Championship Women London, September 1987 from eurohockey.org

Women's EuroHockey Nations Championship
EuroHockey Nations Championship
EuroHockey Nations Championship
International women's field hockey competitions hosted by England
EuroHockey Nations Championship
EuroHockey Nations Championship
Field hockey in London
International sports competitions in London